Maianço is a settlement in the southeast of Lobata District on São Tomé Island in São Tomé and Príncipe. Its population is 639 (2012 census). It lies 1.2 km east of Boa Entrada and 2.5 km southwest of Santo Amaro.

Population history

References

Populated places in Lobata District